The Kabbaliga, or Kabaliga is a subcaste of the Koli Caste mostly found in the India state of Karnataka. Kabbaliga Kolis are trying to be included in the Scheduled Tribe category in order to get reservation benefits.

During the British period, Kabbaliga Kolis were employed as Talwars, who used to protect the villages from robbers and other armies. The Kabbaliga Koli community were engaged in occupations including hunting, animal husbandry, fishing and agriculture. Later, hunting was banned and the majority of these people started practicing agriculture and animal husbandry.

Classification 
The Kabbaliga Kolis are classified as an Other Backward Class, (OBC) by the Government of Karnataka.

Organisations 
 Nijasharana Ambigara Chowdaiah Development Corporation

Titles 
 Talwar, used by Kabbaliga Kolis who served in the British Army.

Clans 
 Heroor
 Jadhav
 Chinchansur
 Madhwaraj
 Chawdhary
 Jamadar

Notable 
 Baburao Chinchansur, former State Minister in the Government of Karnataka
 Pramod Madhwaraj, former Fishery Minister

References 

Koli subcastes